Bear Creek or Bearcreek may refer to:

Places

United States 
 Bear Creek, Alabama, a town in Marion County
 Bear Creek, Alaska, a census-designated place in Kenai Peninsula Borough
 Bear Creek, California (disambiguation), multiple locations
 Bear Creek, Merced County, California, a census-designated place
 Bear Creek, San Joaquin County, California, an unincorporated community
 Bear Creek, Florida, a census-designated place in Pinellas County
 Bearcreek, Missouri, an unincorporated community
 Bearcreek, Montana, a town in Carbon County
 Bear Creek, North Carolina, an unincorporated community in Chatham County
 Bear Creek, Ohio, an unincorporated community 
 Bear Creek Village, Pennsylvania, a borough in Luzerne County
 Bear Creek Village Historic District
 Bear Creek, Texas, a village in Hays County
 Bear Creek, Wisconsin (disambiguation), multiple locations
 Bear Creek, Outagamie County, Wisconsin, a village
 Bear Creek, Sauk County, Wisconsin, a town
 Bear Creek, Waupaca County, Wisconsin, a town
 Bear Creek Corners, Wisconsin, an unincorporated community
 Bear Creek Township, Sevier County, Arkansas
 Bear Creek Township, Christian County, Illinois
 Bear Creek Township, Hancock County, Illinois
 Bear Creek Township, Hamilton County, Kansas
 Bear Creek Township, Michigan, a township in Emmet County
 Bear Creek Township, Clearwater County, Minnesota
 Bear Creek Township, Chatham County, North Carolina
 Bear Creek Township, Luzerne County, Pennsylvania
 Bear Creek Wind Power Project

Canada 
 Bear Creek, Saskatchewan, a hamlet
 Bear Creek, Yukon, a locality

Bodies of water

United States

California 
Bear Creek (Mokelumne River tributary), a tributary of the Mokelumne River in San Joaquin and Calaveras counties
Bear Creek (San Francisquito Creek tributary), also known as Bear Gulch Creek, a tributary of San Francisquito Creek in San Mateo County
Bear Creek (Peters Creek tributary), a tributary of Peters Creek, which is tributary of Pescadero Creek, San Mateo County
Bear Creek (Santa Ana River tributary), a tributary of the Santa Ana River
Bear Creek (Sonoma Creek tributary), a tributary of Sonoma Creek in Sonoma County
Bear Creek (Colusa County), a tributary to Cache Creek within Colusa County draining the Inner Coastal Range. Part of the larger Sacramento River Watershed

Georgia 
Bear Creek (Kinchafoonee Creek tributary)

Iowa 
Bear Creek (Des Moines River tributary), a tributary of the Des Moines River in Iowa
Bear Creek (South Skunk River tributary), a tributary of the South Branch Skunk River in Iowa
Bear Creek (Yellow River tributary), a tributary of the Yellow River in Iowa

Kansas 
Bear Creek (Kansas)

Michigan 
Bear Creek (Michigan), a river

Missouri 
Bear Creek (Big Creek tributary), a stream in Missouri
Bear Creek (Big River tributary), a stream in Missouri
Bear Creek (Blackwater River tributary), a stream in Missouri
Bear Creek (Bull Creek tributary), a stream in Missouri
Bear Creek (Castor River tributary), a stream in Missouri
Bear Creek (Cuivre River tributary), a stream in Missouri
Bear Creek (Davis Creek tributary), a stream in Missouri
Bear Creek (Deepwater Creek tributary), a stream in Missouri
Bear Creek (Fabius River tributary), a stream in Missouri
Bear Creek (Gasconade River tributary), a stream in Missouri
Bear Creek (Heads Creek tributary), a stream in Missouri
Bear Creek (Loutre River tributary), a stream in Missouri
Bear Creek (Middle Fork Grand River tributary), a stream in Missouri
Bear Creek (Mississippi River tributary), a stream in Missouri
Bear Creek (Missouri River tributary), a stream in Missouri
Bear Creek (North Fork Salt River tributary), a stream in Missouri
Bear Creek (Osage River tributary), a stream in Missouri
Bear Creek (Rocky Fork Creek tributary), a stream in Missouri
Bear Creek (Sac River tributary), a stream in southwest Missouri
Bear Creek (Terre Bleue Creek tributary), a stream in Missouri

Montana 
 Bear Creek (Middle Fork Flathead River)

New York 
 Bear Creek (Middle Branch Grass River)

North Carolina 
Bear Creek (Rocky River tributary), a stream in Chatham County
Bear Creek (Deep River tributary), a stream in Moore and Randolph counties
Bear Creek (Neuse River), a tributary of the Neuse River
Bear Creek (Fisher River tributary), a stream in Surry County

Oregon 
 Bear Creek (Oregon), several streams of that name
 Bear Creek (Lincoln County, Oregon), a tributary of the coastal Salmon River
 Bear Creek (Rogue River), a tributary of the Rogue River

Pennsylvania 
 Bear Creek (Allegheny River tributary), a tributary of the Allegheny River
 Bear Creek (Lehigh River tributary), a tributary of the Lehigh River
 Bear Creek (Loyalsock Creek tributary), a tributary of Loyalsock Creek

Wisconsin 
Bear Creek (Little Eau Pleine River tributary), a stream in Wisconsin 
Bear Creek (Mill Creek tributary), a stream in Wisconsin 
Bear Creek (Wisconsin River), a stream in Wisconsin

Elsewhere 
Bear Creek (Tennessee River tributary), in Alabama and Mississippi
Bear Creek (Colorado), a tributary that joins the South Platte River near Denver
Bear Creek (Red Bird River tributary), a stream in Kentucky
Bear Creek (Zumbro River), a stream in Minnesota
Bear Creek (Upper Iowa River tributary), in Iowa and Minnesota
Bear Creek (New Jersey), a tributary of the Pequest River
Bear Creek Reservoir, in Alabama
Bear Creek (Washington), a tributary of the Sammamish River in Washington

Canada
Bear Creek (Tahltan River), a tributary of the Tahltan River on Level Mountain in northwest British Columbia
Lambly Creek, also known as Bear Creek, in British Columbia, Canada

Schools

Canada 
Bear Creek Elementary School, British Columbia
Bear Creek Secondary School, Ontario

United States 
Bear Creek High School (California)
Bear Creek High School (Colorado)
The Bear Creek School, Washington

Churches
 Bear Creek Baptist Church, Kirksville, Missouri
 Bear Creek Cumberland Presbyterian Church, Mooresville, Tennessee

Music
 Bear Creek (album), a 2012 album by Brandi Carlile
 Bear Creek Guitars, guitar manufacturer
 Bear Creek Studio, recording studio in Woodinville, Washington

Recreation areas
 Bear Creek Provincial Park, British Columbia
 Bear Creek Cañon Park, Colorado Springs, Colorado
 Bear Creek Regional Park and Nature Center, Colorado Springs, Colorado
 Bear Creek Lake State Park, Cumberland, Virginia
 Bear Creek Pioneers Park, Houston, Texas
 Bear Creek Mountain Resort, Macungie, Pennsylvania

Other uses
 Bear Creek (meteorite), found in 1866 in Jefferson County, Colorado, United States

See also

 Bear Branch (disambiguation)
 Bear Brook (disambiguation)
 Bear River (disambiguation)
 Bear Lake (disambiguation)